Birna Ingibjörg Valgardsdóttir (born 19 January 1976) is an Icelandic former basketball player who won eight Icelandic championships, in a record twelve trips to the national finals, and five Icelandic Cups. She was named the Icelandic Female Basketball Player of the Year in 2002 and 2004.

Birna was the second player to break the 5000 points barrier in Úrvalsdeild kvenna and is its all-time leading scorer. In December 2014, she broke the Úrvalsdeild kvenna all-time record for games played and held that record until March 2023, when it was broken by Sigrún Sjöfn Ámundadóttir.

After difficult injuries during the later part of her career, Birna retired following the 2014-2015 season.

Icelandic national team
Between 1995 and 2009, Birna played 76 games for the Icelandic national basketball team.

Awards and honours
2x Icelandic Basketball Player of the Year (2002, 2004)
9x Úrvalsdeild Domestic All-First Team (1997, 2002–2006, 2009–2011)
8x Icelandic league champion (1995, 2000, 2003–2005, 2008, 2011, 2013)
5× Icelandic Basketball Cup (1997, 2000, 2004, 2011, 2013)
10x Icelandic Supercup (1995, 1996, 2000, 2001, 2003-2005, 2007, 2008, 2013)
7x Icelandic Company Cup (2002–2004, 2007, 2008, 2010, 2014)
Úrvalsdeild kvenna all-time career scoring leader

References

External links
FIBA Europe profile

1976 births
Living people
Birna Valgardsdottir
Birna Valgardsdottir
Small forwards
Birna Valgardsdottir
Birna Valgardsdottir
Birna Valgardsdottir
Birna Valgardsdottir
Birna Valgardsdottir